Eugen Neuhaus (August 18, 1879 - October 28, 1963) was a German-born American oil painter, university professor, and the author of four books. He was educated in Kassel and Berlin, he emigrated to the United States in 1904, and he became a naturalized U.S. citizen in 1911. He taught at the University of California, Berkeley from 1907 to 1949, including as a full professor from 1927 to 1949, and at the Dominican University of California from 1928 to 1932.

References

1879 births
1963 deaths
German emigrants to the United States
University of California, Berkeley faculty
Dominican University of California faculty
American male painters
Painters from California
20th-century American painters
20th-century American male artists